Manuel Navarro Luna (29 August 1894 – 15 June 1966) was a Cuban poet and journalist.

20th-century Cuban poets
Cuban male poets
1894 births
1966 deaths
20th-century male writers